Joyce Diane Brothers  (October 20, 1927 – May 13, 2013) was an American psychologist, television personality, advice columnist, and writer.

She first became famous in 1955 for winning the top prize on the American game show The $64,000 Question.  Her fame from the game show allowed her to go on to host various advice columns and television shows, which established her as a pioneer in the field of "pop (popular) psychology".

Brothers is often credited as the first to normalize psychological concepts to the American mainstream. Her syndicated columns were featured in newspapers and magazines, including a monthly column for Good Housekeeping, in which she contributed  for nearly 40 years. As Brothers quickly became the "face of  psychology" for American audiences, she often appeared in various television roles, usually as herself. From the 1970s onward, she also began to accept fictional roles that parodied her "woman psychologist" persona. She is noted for working continuously for five decades across various genres. Numerous groups recognized Brothers for her strong leadership as a woman in the psychological field and for helping to destigmatize the profession overall.

Family and personal relationships 
Joyce Diane Bauer was born to Morris K. Bauer and Estelle Rapport, who were attorneys sharing a law practice. She grew up in Far Rockaway, Queens, New York. She had a sister named Elaine Goldsmith, with whom she was close. Joyce described that, while she was growing up, her father treated her like the son, even having decided to name her "Joseph" instead of Joyce before she was born. As a result, she grew up in an environment in which her status as a female made no difference in the family's expectations of high academic excellence for all their children. Consequently, she was often described as being a studious person, thriving on "hard work and academic achievement".

In 1949, she married Milton Brothers, who later went on to become an internist. In 1989, Brothers lost her husband to bladder cancer. Following the death of her husband, Brothers fell into a state of depression for a year and contemplated suicide; however, she used her work to achieve inner peace and recover. Brothers and her husband had a daughter, four grandchildren and two great-grandchildren.

Education 
Brothers graduated from Far Rockaway High School in January 1944. Afterwards, she entered Cornell University, double-majoring in home economics and psychology and graduated with a B.S. degree with honors in 1947. Brothers was a member of Sigma Delta Tau sorority at the time. She then attended  Columbia University, where she obtained an M.A. degree in 1949 and a Ph.D. in psychology in 1953. Her doctoral dissertation was titled "Anxiety Avoidance and Escape Behaviour as Measured by Action Potential in Muscle". While working on her graduate studies, she was a research assistant at Columbia, an instructor at Hunter College, and a research fellow on a UNESCO leadership project from 1949 to 1959. The American Association of University Women awarded Brothers a fellowship in 1952, which enabled her to complete the doctoral degree.

Career

Licensure as a psychologist 
As a psychologist, Brothers had been licensed in New York since 1958.

Television and radio

$64,000 Question (1955)
Brothers' first television appearance was at the age of 28. At that time, her husband was making $50 a month as a medical intern at Mount Sinai Hospital in New York, which was not enough to support them and their three-year-old daughter. To escape what Brothers called the "slum-like conditions" of her New York City walkup, she was driven to enter as a contestant on the game show The $64,000 Question. The top-charting show had the largest jackpot of all quiz shows at the time.

To become a contestant, Brothers had to write a letter describing herself and her hobbies, why she would make a great contestant, and what she would do if she were to carry forth with the winnings. Eventually, the letter landed her an interview with Mert Koplin, the show's producer. While in her letter she discussed her qualifications in the field of psychology and home economics, she was not allowed to use her expert knowledge for the show, as The $64,000 Question did not allow participants to be quizzed on topics of their expertise or profession. As such, Brothers had to come up with a new topic area for her to be quizzed on for the show.

With the gender roles of the time in mind, Koplin thought he could draw in the most viewership by juxtaposing Brothers' perceived frailty as a woman with the idea that she knew a great deal about a more masculine field. He is credited with saying Brothers should be given a topic on "something that [she] shouldn't know about... [something like] if it were football or if it were horse racing or boxing...."

Brothers' husband was a great fan of boxing, so she chose that as her topic. To prepare, she studied twenty-volume boxing encyclopedias and many years' worth of Ring Magazine issues and worked with boxing writer Nat Fleischer and former Olympic boxing champion and New York State Athletic Commissioner Edward P.F Eagan. After studying, she progressed on the show for several weeks. Despite the show's producers' efforts to stump her at the $16,000 mark by asking questions involving referees rather than the boxers themselves, she exceeded expectations and won the top prize.

Brothers used her photographic memory and focus to learn everything she could and quickly became regarded as an expert in the subject area of boxing. Her success on The $64,000 Question earned Brothers a chance to be the color commentator for CBS during the boxing match between Carmen Basilio and Sugar Ray Robinson. She was said to have been the first female boxing commentator.

Two years later, Brothers appeared on the spin-off series The $64,000 Challenge, which brought in the winners of The $64,000 Question and matched them against experts in the field. Again, Brothers walked off with the maximum prize, winning against seven other competitors. (The combined $128,000 in winnings would be equivalent to over $1.3 million in 2021.)

While The $64,000 Question and The $64,000 Challenge later came out with cheating scandals of some contestants only pretending to be novices to their respective topic, Brothers was one of the contestants who was cleared of cheating allegations.

Sports Showcase (1956)
After the success of the quiz show, Brothers co-hosted the Sports Showcase with journalist Max Kase. This made her one of the first female sports commentators.

Local afternoon show on NBC’s WRCA-TV 
Brothers' wish to use her platform to practice psychology was provided through reading letters from people who submitted them to the radio. This opportunity was provided on a four-week basis on NBC's WRCA-TV.

Appearances on talk shows 
Brothers appeared on The Tonight Show Starring Johnny Carson as a means for the public to get to know her more than just through the advice columns. With more than ninety appearances on the show, she provided detailed psychological updates on the accounts of the current social climate of that time. She also appeared on daytime television programs like Good Morning America, Today, Entertainment Tonight, and CNN as well as late-night television shows with Merv Griffin, Mike Douglas, and Conan O’Brien, amongst many others, including The Steve Allen Show, Body Language, and The Dick Cavett Show.

Living Easy with Dr. Joyce Brothers, her own talk show (1973) 
In efforts to market and promote their new textile fibre Trevira polyester, the German chemical company Hoechst provided Joyce Brothers with her own show. While Brothers had the opportunity to host her own show and allow the public to learn more about her, the show's ultimate function was to promote Trevira and the company's latest fashions. This was evident in almost every aspect of the show, from when Brothers would casually segue her discussions onto the topic of fashion to the very set itself, which was decorated entirely in the Trevira fabric.

The show was initially located in the Broadway Theatre District in New York and moved to Studio 6B at 30 Rockefeller Plaza during its second year. Titled Living Easy with Dr. Joyce Brothers, the show consisted of guest interviews, musical performances, how-to-demos, and a weekly segment dedicated to psychology. Two hundred episodes were produced, airing on 150 stations during its three year run. The show faced criticisms from stakeholders and the public who believed there was not enough focus on psychology and that Brothers was failing to adequately incorporate her psychological expertise.

Dr. Joyce Brothers Show (1985) 

A decade after Living Easy with Dr. Joyce Brothers, Brothers premiered a new show. It consisted of 16 one-hour weekly installments on the Disney Channel. This was her first appearance on cable television. The themes surrounding the show were family oriented, with each show consisting of a comedian, a special guest star, and calls from viewers to provide advice from a psychological and educational standpoint.

By August 1985, Brothers was given her own television show on a New York station about relationships during which she answered questions from the audience. Sponsors were nervous about whether a television psychologist could succeed, she recalled, but viewers expressed their gratitude for her show, telling her she was giving them the information they could not get elsewhere.

Brothers covered a variety of topics, including prognosis for American football, the psychology of football, women's changing clothing styles, HIV and AIDS, and school shootings. In essence, Brothers brought psychology to the mainstream media.

Brothers presented syndicated advice shows on both television and radio, during a broadcasting career that lasted more than four decades. Her shows changed names numerous times, from The Dr. Joyce Brothers Show to Consult Dr. Brothers to Tell Me, Dr. Brothers to Ask Dr. Brothers to Living Easy with Dr. Joyce Brothers. In 1964, she interviewed and posed for publicity photographs with the Beatles on their first visit to the United States.

Cameo appearances 
Brothers made cameo appearances as herself in the comedy series Police Squad! and its first spinoff film The Naked Gun, in which she played a sports announcer (baseball, not boxing). Dr. Brothers appeared as herself in season 3 episode 6 of Mama’s Family in the episode titled “Mama and Dr. Brothers”. She appeared as herself in season 4 episode 21 of the popular sitcom Taxi and in both season 3 and season 5 of the sitcom The Nanny. She also voiced an animated version of herself in the episode "Last Exit to Springfield" in season 4 of The Simpsons as well as a season 1 episode of Frasier portraying a "nut", as well as in a second-season episode of Entourage. And in Married with children as  a judge
 She also makes an appearance as a crime scene pathologist in the movie National Lampoon's: Loaded Weapon.

 Newspaper and books 
Brothers also had a monthly column in Good Housekeeping for almost four decades and a syndicated newspaper column that she began writing in the 1970s which at its height was printed in more than 300 newspapers. She also published several books, including the 1981 book What Every Woman Should Know About Men and the 1991 book Widowed, inspired by the loss of her husband. Her advice was also used as a source for some questions on the 1998–2004 incarnation of Hollywood Squares.''

Joyce Brothers conducted self promotion and was seemingly skilled in navigating the male-dominated media industry. In addition to her television and radio presence, Brothers wrote best-selling books; these books included advice on how to achieve a successful marriage and career.

Impact

Social conversation
She was viewed as the public crisis counselor, as she was asked to comment on issues like Princess Diana's death and the explosion of the Challenger space shuttle.

Joyce Brothers addressed homosexuality in 1972, and the transgender community in 1959, easing her viewers into it from the prior standpoint in which they were raised.  After the 1999 Columbine school shooting, she was a persistent presence on CNN for gun control legislation.

More memorable episodes of her advice shows include when she helped a man on air who called in contemplating suicide as a result of being blind in one eye and nearly blind in the other. Her efforts included keeping him on air for thirty minutes—long enough for National Save-A-Life to contact him. Another, similar episode aired in 1971 when a woman called in and was threatening to overdose on sleeping pills. As this was a riveting circumstance, the show was left running for 3 more hours uninterrupted, so that Brothers was able to extract a phone number from the woman to get an ambulance to her.

Sexism
Upon receiving acceptance into Columbia University for her Ph.D, the dean of her department told her that while her qualifications were impeccable, she was taking the position of a man who would use the degree and it would therefore be best if she dropped her position. However, Brothers did not waver and maintained her position.

Despite this, she was a product of the time, as evidenced by her belief that her husband should be the breadwinner. She thus gave up any notion of pursuing a career in psychology for herself, as it could mean being in competition with her husband. Early in her career, when Brothers was asked by women for advice on what to do if their husbands showed interest in other women, Brothers was known to ask the caller to look at themselves and ask what they could do to be more like the women their husbands seemed to chase. Brothers later became more involved with issues of women's rights. In 1972, she was one of many who testified in front of the platform committee on women's issues, also serving as acting chair of a US delegation for the 16th assembly of the Inter-American Commission of Women. In 1979, she provided proposals at the congressional hearing on "problems of mid-life women,” speaking on employment, retirement income, and anti-ageism in television characters.

Criticism, positive contributions, and awards

Controversy surrounding Brothers’ "Pop Psychology" 
As her fame grew there was an increase in disapproval among psychologists and psychiatrists. They questioned both the validity of her psychological claims and her authority in providing psychological advice. A growing number of psychologists began to believe the advice she provided to her audience was unethical insofar as she did not hold any clinical degree and she was giving advice to strangers, not to patients with whom she had professional relationships. Stevens and Gardener, the authors of “Women of Psychology,” stated that “traditional psychologists smile subtly when her name is mentioned and they often complain that she actually does more damage than good." There were many attempts by American Psychological Association members to revoke Brothers’ membership; they objected to the form in which Brothers' advice was provided. Although her membership was never revoked, Brothers' very public professional activities did cause some uproar in the community.

De-stigmatizing psychology 
Despite the criticism, at the end of one of her TV appearance in December 1958, Roger Turtle and Joyce Brothers discussed the logistics behind the process of her TV appearances. There were 15 hours spent preparing for each show, with consultations with other professionals and the breakdown of the grand field of psychology to be understood in terms of everyday language. All this occurring behind the scenes, during the actual shows there were many references to scientific research and explicit statements that psychology is a service not simply a source of entertainment. These shows provided a platform to "professionalize and de-stigmatize psychology". Mental health was very stigmatized and not as covered in the media, but Joyce Brothers strived to contribute significantly to giving people a different perspective. Her show allowed the public to view psychologists as real people.

With an influx of letters from those that wanted advice from several topics like: marriage, parenting, work, money also other taboo topics like menopause, infidelity and sex. Her light on these topics assisted in normalizing these within the mainstream media, with an explicit importance on therapy for everyday life and not only those with mental illness stated.

Honors and awards 
Brothers was also recognized with the following honors and awards: Women of Achievement Award, Federation of Jewish Women (1964); Professional Woman of the Year, Business and Professional Women's Club (1968); Award of the Parkinson Disease Foundation. Brothers was also recognized not just with awards but also in many different areas. She was given an honorary degree, the L.H.D., from Franklin Pierce College in 1969.

Death 
Brothers died on May 13, 2013, at her home in Fort Lee, New Jersey. Lisa Brothers Arbisser, her daughter, said that respiratory failure was the cause.

References

External links

 
 
 Sydney Stahl Weinberg, an entry about Joyce Brothers profile at the Jewish Women's Archive, a Comprehensive Historical Encyclopedia

1927 births
2013 deaths
American advice columnists
American psychology writers
Television personalities from New York City
American women television personalities
American women columnists
American women psychologists
20th-century American psychologists
Boxing commentators
Burials at Beth David Cemetery
Celebrity doctors
Columbia University alumni
Contestants on American game shows
Cornell University alumni
Deaths from respiratory failure
Far Rockaway High School alumni
Hunter College faculty
Jewish American journalists
Jewish American social scientists
Jewish American writers
People from Far Rockaway, Queens
People from Fort Lee, New Jersey
Women science writers
Writers from Queens, New York
21st-century American Jews
21st-century American women